Fred Grayson Sayre (1879 - December 31, 1938) was an American engraver, illustrator, and painter.

Life
Sayre was born in 1879 in Medoc, Missouri. He briefly worked as a businessman.

Sayre began his artistic career as an engraver in Houston, Texas and Chicago, Illinois. He became a painter in Arizona, and he later moved to Glendale, California. He first exhibited his work in 1923 in San Francisco.

With his wife Ruth, Sayre had a daughter, Barbara. He died on December 31, 1938, in Glendale, at age 59.

Further reading

References

1879 births
1938 deaths
People from Jasper County, Missouri
People from Glendale, California
American engravers
American illustrators
American male painters
Painters from California
20th-century American painters
20th-century American male artists